Scopula nigrociliata is a moth of the family Geometridae. It is found in Afghanistan.

References

Moths described in 1965
nigrociliata
Moths of Asia